Dindir is a village in Aurangabad District of Bihar, India. It is located 48 km north from District headquarter Aurangabad, 7 km east from Haspura and 94 km south from Patna. Area wise it is the largest village of district Aurangabad and is designated as ideal village. Dindir Pin code is 824120 and postal head office is Haspura .

Schools 
 Devchand singh High school (Government).
 Rajkiye Buniyadi Vidyalaya (Government) .
 middle school (Government) .
 Model school (Government).
private school

References

Villages in Aurangabad district, Bihar